Freeport station is a passenger rail station in Freeport, Maine, which is located on Amtrak's Downeaster line. The Downeaster operates from North Station in Boston to Brunswick Maine Street Station in Brunswick, Maine, via the Portland Transportation Center in Portland, Maine.  Freeport was part of a $38.3 million project to rehabilitate  of track between Portland and Brunswick. Most of the money came from the federal government with an additional $500,000 of state money spent on platforms on Freeport and Brunswick. The first official service to the station was on November 1, 2012.

References

External links 

 Freeport, ME – USA RailGuide (TrainWeb)

Amtrak stations in Maine
Transportation buildings and structures in Cumberland County, Maine
Stations along Boston and Maine Railroad lines
Railway stations in the United States opened in 2012